Burton Cannon House, also known as Windsor, is a historic home located at Cokesbury, Somerset County, Maryland. It is a -story frame dwelling, four bays wide and two bays deep..  It was built in the late 1790s.

It was listed on the National Register of Historic Places in 1975.

References

External links
, including photo from 1967, at Maryland Historical Trust

Houses in Somerset County, Maryland
Houses on the National Register of Historic Places in Maryland
Houses completed in 1797
National Register of Historic Places in Somerset County, Maryland
1797 establishments in Maryland